San Angelo is a city in and the county seat of Tom Green County, Texas, United States. Its location is in the Concho Valley, a region of West Texas between the Permian Basin to the northwest, Chihuahuan Desert to the southwest, Osage Plains to the northeast, and Central Texas to the southeast. According to a 2019 Census estimate, San Angelo had a total population of 101,004. It is the principal city and center of the San Angelo metropolitan area, which had a population of 118,182.

San Angelo is home to Angelo State University, historic Fort Concho, and Goodfellow Air Force Base.

History

In 1632, a short-lived mission of Franciscans under Spanish auspices was founded in the area to serve native people.
The mission was led by the friars Juan de Salas and Juan de Ortega, with Ortega remaining for six months.
The area was visited by the Castillo-Martin expedition of 1650 and the Diego de Guadalajara expedition of 1654.

During the development the region, San Angelo was at the western edge of the region called Texas, successively claimed in the 1800s by the nations of Spain, Mexico, the Republic of Texas, and finally, the United States in 1846.

The current city of San Angelo was founded in 1867, when the United States built Fort Concho, one of a series of new forts designed to protect the frontier. The fort was home to cavalry, infantry, and the famous Black Cavalry, also known as buffalo soldiers by American Indians.

The settler Bartholomew J. DeWitt founded the village of Santa Angela outside the fort at the junction of the North and South Concho Rivers. He named the village after his wife, Carolina Angela. The name was eventually changed to San Angela. The name would change again to San Angelo in 1883 on the insistence of the United States Postal Service, as San Angela was grammatically incorrect in Spanish. The town became a trade center for farmers and settlers in the area, as well as a fairly lawless cowtown filled with brothels, saloons, and gambling houses.

After being designated as the county seat, the town grew quickly in the 1880s, aided by being on the route of newly constructed railroads. It became a central transportation hub for the region. The Santa Fe Railroad arrived in 1888 and the Kansas City, Mexico and Orient Railway in 1909. After a tuberculosis (TB) outbreak hit the United States in the early 1900s, many patients moved to San Angelo. At the time, doctors could only recommend rest in dry, warm climates. TB sufferers went to San Angelo for treatment, and a sanitarium was built in nearby Carlsbad.

In 1928, the city founded San Angelo College, one of the region's first institutes of higher education. The city had been passed over by the Texas State Legislature to be the home of what would become Texas Tech University. San Angelo College, one of the first municipal colleges, has grown to become Angelo State University. The military returned to San Angelo during World War II with the founding of Goodfellow Air Force Base, which was assigned to train pilots at the time. San Angelo grew exponentially during the oil boom of the 1900s, when vast amounts of oil were found in the area, and the city became a regional hub of the oil and gas industry.

The San Angelo Independent School District became one of the first in Texas to integrate, doing so voluntarily in 1955.

San Angelo was famous for Miss Wool of America Pageant, an annual event organized by the National Wool Growers Association (U.S.)

Geography
According to the United States Census Bureau, the city has a total area of 58.2 sq mi (150.9 km), of which 2.3 sq mi (6.1 km) (4.03%) are covered by water.

San Angelo falls on the northwestern edge of the Edwards Plateau and the northeastern edge of the Chihuahuan Desert at the junction of the North and South Concho Rivers. The city has three lakes: Twin Buttes Reservoir, O.C. Fisher Reservoir, and Lake Nasworthy. The Middle Concho River joined the South Concho several miles upstream, but the confluence has been obscured by the Twin Buttes dam.

Climate
San Angelo falls near the boundary between the subtropical semiarid steppe (Köppen BSh) and midlatitude steppe climates (Köppen BSk). It is located at the region where Central Texas meets West Texas weather. Temperatures reach  about 18 times in a typical year. The typical year has 50 days with lows below freezing. Though the region does experience snow and sleet, they occur only a few times a year.

Demographics

2020 census

As of the 2020 United States census,  99,893 people, 36,843 households, and 23,026 families were residing in the city.

2010 census
As of the census of 2010, 93,200 people, 36,117 households, and 22,910 families resided in the city. The population density was 1,601 people/sq mi (618/km). The racial makeup of the city was about 83.0% White, 5.4% African American, 1.4% Native American, 1.7% Asian, 11.3% from other races, and 2.6% from two or more races. Hispanics or Latinos of any race were 38.5% of the population.

Of the 36,117 households, 27.6% had children under 18 living with them, 44.2% were married couples living together, 14.2% had a female householder with no husband present, and 36.6% were not families. About 29.8% of all households were made up of individuals, and 11.2% had someone living alone who was 65 or older. The average household size was 2.45 and the average family size was 3.05.

In the city, the age distribution was 23.4% under 18 and 13.8% who were 65 or older. The median age was 32.8 years. The population was 48.7% male and 51.3% female.

The median income for a household in the city was $38,777, and for a family was $49,640. Males had a median income of $33,257 versus $26,750 for females. The per capita income for the city was $20,970. About 13.9% of families and 17.4% of the population were below the poverty line, including 25.4% of those under age 18 and 10.5% of those age 65 or over.

Economy

San Angelo has consistently been ranked by many publications and rankings as one of the best small cities for business and employment. In 2013, it ranked fourth in the nation in Forbes magazine's "Best Small Cities For Jobs" rankings. In 2010, Kiplinger's Personal Finance named San Angelo as one of the "Best Cities of the Next Decade". In 2009, CNN Money ranked San Angelo as one of the best cities to launch a small business.

San Angelo has a diverse economy for a city of its size. Although most oil fields lie to the west, many oil-field service companies based in the city employ a large number of local residents. The agricultural industry in San Angelo remains strong. Producer's Livestock Auction is the nation's largest for sheep and lambs, and is among the top five in the nation for cattle auctions. Though most agricultural work is done outside the city, thousands of employees work in the cattle and lamb meat-processing industries, and many more work in agriculture supporting roles inside the city. Two agricultural research centers are located in San Angelo: the Angelo State University Management Instruction and Research Center and the Texas A&M Texas AgriLife Research and Extension Center at San Angelo.

The telecommunication industry is a strong employer in San Angelo. Sitel has a call center in San Angelo. In addition, Frontier Communications, Performant Recovery Inc. (formerly DCS), a debt recovery corporation, and Blue Cross all employ over 1,000 individuals each locally. San Angelo serves as the regional medical center for west-central Texas. Shannon Medical Center employs over 3,000 in San Angelo and provides services to a large region of west-central Texas. The manufacturing industry has seen hits since the 1990s; however, many large employers still remain, including Ethicon a division of Johnson & Johnson, Conner Steel, and Hirschfield Steel.

The several large institutional employers in the city include Shannon Medical Center, Angelo State University, and Goodfellow Air Force Base.  The last remains the largest employer in the region, employing or providing income for over 24,000 in San Angelo.

The Sunset Mall, the area's major shopping mall, opened in 1979.

Arts and culture

San Angelo Museum of Art
The San Angelo Museum of Fine Arts opened in 1999 in downtown San Angelo on the banks of the Concho River, built with local limestone and end-grain Texas mesquite. It attracts over 85,000 visitors a year, and is home to the National Ceramic Competition.

San Angelo Performing Arts Center
The San Angelo Performing Arts Center (PAC) provides access to the highest level of performing arts by presenting local, national, and international touring shows at  two historic venues: the 1350-seat 1928 Murphey Auditorium and the Stephens Performing Arts Center (formerly a Coca-Cola factory) which contains the 300-seat Brooks and Bates Theater, a black-box theater, seven ballet studios, and administrative spaces. Since its inaugural 2017–2018 season, SAPAC has hosted over 100 performances annually.

Art galleries
Downtown San Angelo is home to various art galleries. The San Angelo Art Walk, held every third Thursday, includes a viewing of the various downtown art galleries. These include the Kendall Art Gallery, Ruiz Studio, Black Swan Gallery, the Glass Prism, Bonnie Beesley Rug Gallery, and the Wool 'n Cotton Shop, as well as other public art venues. A free trolley service is available to the public.

San Angelo Symphony
The San Angelo Symphony, founded in 1949, plays several events a year, with its feature event being on July 3. Over 20,000 people regularly attend that performance, which takes place at the River Stage, an outdoor venue on the Concho River.

Angelo Civic Theatre
Angelo Civic Theatre is the oldest community theatre in Texas. It was founded on November 21, 1885, to raise resources for a town clock at the county courthouse. Though wavering economic times and two world wars stopped artistic efforts in the community on a number of occasions, theatrical productions continued.  In 1950, Angelo Civic Theatre gained nonprofit status and a sustainable form of theatre was established.

In 1969‚ a fire demolished the school building in which the theatre was housed. The theatre performed at various locations for 13 years, until purchasing the 230-seat historical Parkway Theater in 1980. Angelo Civic Theatre continues to serve the community of San Angelo and produce six in-house plays a year.

Ballet San Angelo
Ballet San Angelo was founded in 1983 for the purpose of presenting an annual production of The Nutcracker. It offers a full season of productions including a choreography performance and a Children's Ballet. Ballet San Angelo also offers ballet training for students, a fitness program, a scholarship, and a community outreach program.

Plays at Angelo State University
Angelo State University, through "The Arts at ASU", puts on six plays a year open to the general public. These range from dinner theater and theater-in-the-round to conventional theatre productions, using the only active modular theatre in the United States. The university also presents numerous concerts and recitals throughout the year, and has numerous displays in the Angelo State University Art Gallery. The public is encouraged to attend.

Parks and recreation

City park system
The San Angelo City Park system was created in 1903. The department maintains a 33-acre municipal golf course (Santa Fe Park Golf Course) along the river, 25 playgrounds, and 25 sports practice fields.

The parks feature many plazas, public art displays, and numerous water features. The city is home to the International Water Lily Collection. The park contains over 300 varieties of water lilies, one of the largest collections in the world.

The city also provides several municipal parks on Lake Nasworthy, one of three lakes near the city; the others are Twin Buttes Reservoir and O.C. Fisher Reservoir.

San Angelo State Park
The  San Angelo State Park, owned and maintained by the Texas Parks and Wildlife Department, is located on the shores of the O.C. Fisher Reservoir. The park is home to the official State of Texas Longhorn herd.

San Angelo Nature Center
The San Angelo Nature Center, located at Lake Nasworthy, is an educational center open to the public. It features many native and exotic animals, including alligators, bobcats, prairie dogs, tortoises, and 85 different species of reptiles, including 22 different species of rattlesnakes. The center includes the Spring Creek Wetland, which has  being developed by the Federal Bureau of Reclamation, including a  trail; its terrain varies from a semiarid environment to a freshwater marsh. It also maintains the one-mile (1.6-km) nature trail off Spillway Road.

Fort Concho
Historic Fort Concho, a National Historic Landmark maintained by the city of San Angelo, was founded in 1867 by the United States Army to protect settlers and maintain vital trade routes. It frequently experienced skirmishes with the then-hostile Comanche tribe. Today, the restored site is home to several museums, and is open to visitors Tuesday through Sunday. Fort Concho is one of nine forts along the Texas Forts Trail.

San Angelo Stock Show and Rodeo
The San Angelo Stock Show and Rodeo is held annually. It began in 1932, making it one of the longest-running rodeos in the world. It is nationally renowned within the rodeo circuit, bringing in the top contestants and ranking as one of top-10 rodeos in the nation for monetary prizes awarded to contestants. It includes a parade, carnival, and concerts, and many other events in addition to the main stock show and rodeo.

Education

Higher education

San Angelo is home to Angelo State University. Founded in 1928, it enrolls about 10,000 students, who come from almost every county in Texas, 40 states, and 24 countries. One of the nation's premier regional universities, it was featured in the Princeton Review Best 373. The only other two listed from the state were Texas A&M University and the University of Texas at Austin.

Angelo State offers almost 100 different undergraduate programs and 23 graduate programs, including three doctoral programs. The university is divided into six colleges: Business, Education, Liberal and Fine Arts, Nursing and Allied Health, Sciences, and Graduate Studies. It has been a member of the Texas Tech University System since 2007.

San Angelo has a branch of Howard College, which is based in Big Spring, Texas. The two-year school prepares students academically for transfer to a four-year university, and concentrates in technical and occupational fields of study that lead to certificates and/or associate in applied science degrees.

A branch of Park University is located on the Goodfellow Air Force Base. The Goodfellow Campus Center has been providing higher education to the Concho Valley area since 1989. Park University's main campus was established in 1875 and is located in Parkville, Missouri.

San Angelo is also home to a branch of American Commercial College, a private for-profit career college. It offers seven career certificate programs.

Public primary and secondary education
Almost all of San Angelo is in the San Angelo Independent School District. Small parts are served by the Wall Independent School District (southeast San Angelo) and the Grape Creek Independent School District (northwest San Angelo). The two main high schools are Central with Central Freshmen Campus and Lake View. Three middle schools and 21 elementary schools are within San Angelo city limits.

Private and alternative education
Eight private schools operate in the city, certified through the 12th grade, which include Ambleside School of San Angelo (a member of Ambleside Schools International), San Angelo Christian Academy, the Angelo Catholic School (only up to 8th grade), Cornerstone Christian School, Gateway Christian Academy, Trinity Lutheran School, Potter's Hand Christian School, and Texas Leadership Charter Academy (a charter school).

Media

Newspapers
 San Angelo Standard-Times (print)
 GoSanAngelo (digital)

Television

Radio

AM stations

FM stations

Infrastructure

Transportation
San Angelo is served by the San Angelo Regional Airport, which offers daily flights through Envoy Air to Dallas/Fort Worth. Intrastate and interstate bus service is provided by Greyhound, with regularly scheduled service to major cities in Texas and nationwide. Intracity public transportation is provided by the Concho Valley Transit District with five fixed bus routes.

The BNSF Railway serves the town and the Texas Pacifico has a lease on a TxDOT rail line, formerly the Kansas Cho Valley Transit District, with its five fixed bus routes, with transfers provided at the Santa Fe station. The bus service runs from 6:30 am to 6:30 pm, Monday through Saturday. Taxi service is available throughout the city by Red Ball Taxi and Shuttle, Checker Cab, All American Cab and Yellow Cab.

Notable people

 Jane Ford Aebersold (born 1941), artist
 Jay Presson Allen (1922–2006), screenwriter and playwright
 Robert Nason Beck (1928–2008), pioneer researcher of uses of radioactive materials, such as technetium-99, for medical imaging using positron emission tomography, was born and has family in San Angelo
 John Boles (1895–1969), American actor in silent movies through the 1950s, spent his retirement in San Angelo
 Frank "Bring'em Back Alive" Buck (1884–1950), lived in San Angelo in 1940s and 1950s
 Gary Lee Conner, former Screaming Trees guitarist, resides in San Angelo
 Paula DeAnda (born 1989), singer, was born in San Angelo
 Colby Donaldson (born 1974), Survivor contestant and actor, was born just outside San Angelo and lived in the city
 Jeff Drost (born 1964), former NFL player, was born in San Angelo
 Felicia Elizondo (1946–2021), LGBT activist and trans woman, was born in San Angelo
 Joe Feagin (born 1938), Texas A&M University professor, was born in San Angelo
 Sterlin Gilbert (born 1978), football coach
 James Gill (born 1934), pop artist
 Crawford Goldsby, also known as "Cherokee Bill" (1876–1896), was born in Fort Concho (across the Concho River from San Angelo)
 Dorsey B. Hardeman (1902–1992), mayor of San Angelo, 1936–1938, served 26 years in both houses of the Texas State Legislature; he was an advocate of water expansion in West Texas
 Pierce Holt, College Football Hall of Fame member, attended Angelo State University; he played for the San Francisco 49ers and Atlanta Falcons in 1990s, and was a two-time Pro Bowl selection
 David Hulse (born 1968), former Major Leaguer, attended  Central High School; he played for the  Texas Rangers and Milwaukee Brewers in the 1990s
 George B. Jackson (1850–1900), African-American businessman and rancher from San Angelo, is considered the "wealthiest African American in Texas" in the second half of the 19th century
 Elmer Kelton (1926–2009), award-winning western writer, journalist, and novelist; lived in San Angelo
 Steve Kemp (born 1954), former Major League Baseball outfielder, was born in San Angelo
 Colleen R. LaRose, indicted in March 2010 after trying to recruit Islamic terrorists to wage jihad and murder a Swedish artist
 Los Lonely Boys, Grammy-winning musical group from San Angelo
 Greg Maddux (born 1966), four-time Cy Young Award-winning baseball pitcher and Hall of Fame inductee, was born in San Angelo
 Cristina E. Martinez (born 1961), nationally recognized community activist, business owner and non-profit volunteer; born in San Angelo
 Bill McGill (1939–2014), professional basketball player, and top pick of the 1962 NBA Draft, was born in San Angelo
 Marc Menchaca (born 1975), actor; born in San Angelo
 John H. Miller (born 1925), Marine Lieutenant general; born in San Angelo
 Shea Morenz, graduate of San Angelo Central and former Texas Longhorns quarterback, was drafted by the New York Yankees
 Fess Parker (1924–2010), actor; grew up on a ranch near San Angelo
 August Pfluger (born December 28, 1978), Air Force Lieutenant Colonel and current US Representative for Texas's 11th congressional district; graduated from San Angelo Central
 Cliff Richey (born 1946), professional tennis player, won 45 career singles titles, is the 1970 World Grand Prix champion, a two-time Davis Cup champion, the number-one ranked U.S. player in 1970, and co-author of Acing Depression: A Tennis Champion's Toughest Match; he was born in San Angelo and currently resides there
 Nancy Richey (born 1942), professional tennis player, won six Grand Slam titles, and was inducted into International Tennis Hall of Fame 2003; she born in San Angelo and currently resides there
 Lucy A. Snyder, Bram Stoker Award winner and novelist, grew up in San Angelo; she used a fictional version of the city as a setting in some of her work
 Jack Teagarden (1905–1964), jazz trombonist and vocalist
 Steve Trash, illusionist, was born in San Angelo
 Ernest Tubb (1914–1984), musician and member of the Country Music Hall of Fame, worked for several years in San Angelo, and had a daily live music show on a local radio station prior to going to Nashville
 Akash Vukoti (born 2009), Spelling prodigy and TV personality
 Clayton Weishuhn (1959–2022), professional football player

See also

 List of museums in West Texas
 Texas Forts Trail

References

External links

 City of San Angelo, Texas
 Handbook of Texas: San Angelo Page
 
 

 
Cities in Texas
Cities in Tom Green County, Texas